Great Western 90 is a 2-10-0 "Decapod" type steam locomotive owned and operated by the Strasburg Rail Road (SRC) outside of Strasburg, Pennsylvania. Built by the Baldwin Locomotive Works in June 1924, No. 90 originally pulled sugar beet trains for the Great Western Railway of Colorado. In April 1967, No. 90 was sold to the Strasburg Rail Road where it now resides and operates today for use on excursion trains. Today, No. 90 is one of only two operational Decapod type steam locomotives in America, the other being Frisco No. 1630 at the Illinois Railway Museum in Union, Illinois.

History
The locomotive was built by the Baldwin Locomotive Works in June 1924, in Philadelphia, Pennsylvania as a class 12-42-F locomotive. It originally pulled sugar beet trains of about 40 to 50 cars length for the Great Western Railway of Colorado to the company's towering mill in Loveland, Colorado. It was the Great Western's largest and most powerful road locomotive, and saw extensive use on trains too large for the company's fleet of 2-8-0s. Following WWII, the locomotive was used primarily in the Autumn during the harvest season.

By the late 1950s, the engine was occasionally used in excursion service on the Great Western. In 1963, No. 90 pulled a few special excursions for that year's National Railway Historical Society (NRHS) Convention, which was being held in Denver at the time. The locomotive stopped in Longmont, Colorado for a brief photo session alongside CB&Q 4-8-4 No. 5632. On one such excursion, the Strasburg Rail Road's (SRC) Chief Mechanical Officer, Huber Leath, met the Great Western's superintendent, a man who grew up in the vicinity of the Strasburg Rail Road. A deal was subsequently made in which the Great Western would contact the Strasburg Rail Road as soon as the locomotive was removed from service and available for purchase. The Strasburg Rail Road purchased No. 90 on April 5, 1967, for a price of $23,000.00(~$175,000 in 2019) and the locomotive arrived on Strasburg's property a month later on May 5, 1967. Upon arrival, No. 90 would make its first run for Strasburg on May 13, 1967.

In the winter of 1968, Ross Rowland's High Iron Company planned to operate a series of mainline steam excursions between Jersey City, New Jersey and Wilkes-Barre, Pennsylvania on the Central Railroad of New Jersey. Rowland had originally planned to lease two ex-Canadian Pacific G5-class 4-6-2s, numbers 1238 and 1286, both owned by George M. Hart. However, those two locomotives were on emergency leases to the city of Reading, Pennsylvania to provide steam for the city after the boiler at the Reading Steam Heat and Power Co. became disabled. Since tickets for the excursion had already been sold, and Rowland was unwilling to pull the trip with a diesel, he leased Steamtown's ex Canadian Pacific 127 (formerly 1278), a sister to the two locomotives he intended to use to pull the train. However, the 127 did not have enough power to pull the train over the grades on the CNJ near Jim Thorpe, Pennsylvania on her own and Rowland leased the 90 to act as a helper engine for the trips, double-heading with the 127 between Bethlehem and Jim Thorpe, Pennsylvania. After the trips concluded, 90 was returned to Strasburg.

In October 2020, No. 90 was temporarily backdated to its late 1960s appearance with the original SRC "egg" logo, whitewall wheels, and gold pinstripings for the Steam Strikes Back photo charter, commemorating SRC's 60th anniversary.
 
As it was on the Great Western, the engine is also the most powerful of the four steam locomotives in operation at the Strasburg Rail Road in Lancaster County, Pennsylvania, rated for 1,211 tons on the line. It is currently one of the only two 2-10-0 Decapods operating in the United States, the other one is former Frisco No. 1630, which operates at the Illinois Railway Museum. Beginning in April 2023, No. 90 will be taken out of service to undergo its Federal Railroad Administration (FRA) 1,472 day inspection and overhaul.

1944 accident
On November 7, 1944, the engine was hit by a truck at a grade crossing east of Loveland and knocked onto its fireman's side, killing both the fireman and the truck driver. The Great Western sent 90 to the Chicago, Burlington and Quincy Railroad's (CB&Q) shops in Denver for repairs. After repairs were finished, the engine returned to service with GWR.

Gallery

See also
Canadian National 89
Canadian National 7312
Great Western 60
McCloud Railway 19
Norfolk and Western 475
Polson Logging Co. 2
Sierra Railway 28
Soo Line 1003

References

 King, E. W., Jr. in

External links

 Strasburg Rail Road No. 90

2-10-0 locomotives
Baldwin locomotives
Individual locomotives of the United States
Standard gauge locomotives of the United States
Railway locomotives introduced in 1924
Preserved steam locomotives of Pennsylvania